Hangard Wood is a locality  south of Villers-Bretonneux northern France. It was the site of Hangard village and a battle in World War I. The battle of Hangard Wood was part of the German offensive Operation Michael, in the Arras - St-Quentin-La Fére sector of the Somme fought in March 1918. The battle of Hangard Wood was more specifically part of the larger second battle of Villers-Bretonneux, fought between Canadian British/Australian/French and German armies.

The second battle of Villers-Bretonneux on the 24th of April 1918 was significant as the first tank on tank battle in history, and the Red Baron was shot down 21 April.

Today the wood lies adjacent to a British cemetery, maintained by the Commonwealth War Graves Commission, and known as Hangard Wood British Cemetery. John Croak VC is buried there.

Units involved in the battle
173rd Infantry Brigade (Great Britain) 
2/2nd Battalion London regiment 
2/4th Battalion London regiment 
4th Division (Australia) 
12th Brigade (Australia)
5th Brigade (Australia)
18th Battalion (Australia)
19th Battalion (Australia)
20th Battalion (Australia)
33rd Battalion (Australia)
34th Battalion (Australia) 
34th Battalion (Australia) 
35th Battalion (Australia)
36th Battalion (Australia)
1st Moroccan Infantry Division (France)
13th Battalion (Royal Highlanders of Canada), CEF

Victoria Cross recipients
John Croak
Percy Storkey
Herman James Good

Military Medal recipients
John Charles Barnett

References

Battles of the Western Front (World War I)
Villages in France